The Tennessee Manufacturing Company is a complex of six historic buildings in Nashville, Tennessee, USA. They were built from 1869 to 1953. The company was founded by Samuel Morgan. The buildings have been listed on the National Register of Historic Places since June 25, 1999.

References

Industrial buildings and structures on the National Register of Historic Places in Tennessee
Italianate architecture in Tennessee
Buildings and structures completed in 1871
Buildings and structures in Nashville, Tennessee
National Register of Historic Places in Nashville, Tennessee